Diamond is the hardest known natural material.

Diamond may also refer to:

Other common meanings
Diamond (gemstone), use of the mineral as a gemstone
Diamonds (suit), a suit in a standard deck of cards

People
Diamond (surname)
Diamond (given name), a predominantly feminine given name
Thomas Pitt (1653–1726), English merchant nicknamed "Diamond" Pitt for his ownership of the Regent Diamond
Diamond (rapper) (born 1988), American rapper
Alex Diamond, pseudonym of German artist Jörg Heikhaus (born 1967)
Wayne Daniel or Diamond (born 1956), retired cricketer from Barbados
Ramon Dekkers or the Diamond (1969–2013), former Muay Thai and kickboxer
Malaipet or the Diamond (born 1981), mixed martial artist, kickboxer and Muay Thai fighter
Diamond, a member of the TV show American Gladiators
"Diamond" Dallas Page (born 1956), American professional wrestler
"Diamond" Timothy Flowers, American professional wrestler from All-Star Wrestling
Diamond (wrestler), Mexican professional wrestler

Places

United States
Diamond, Alaska, a historical location in Denali Borough, Alaska
Diamond, Georgia, an unincorporated community
Diamond, Illinois, a village
Diamond, Indiana, an unincorporated town
Diamond, Louisiana, an unincorporated community
Diamond, Missouri, a city
Diamond, Ohio, an unincorporated community
Diamond, Oregon, an unincorporated community
Diamond, Kanawha County, West Virginia, an unincorporated community
Diamond, Logan County, West Virginia, an unincorporated community
Diamond, United States Virgin Islands, a settlement
The Diamond (Longs Peak), a cliff on Longs Peak in Colorado
Diamond Bar, California, a city in eastern Los Angeles County
Diamond Brook, a tributary of the Passaic River, New Jersey
Diamond Hill (Cumberland, Rhode Island)
Diamond Island (Kentucky)
Diamond Mountains (Nevada)
Diamond Peak (disambiguation)
Diamond Springs, California, formerly Diamond, a census-designated place
Diamond Valley (Nevada)
Diamond Island (New York), an island on Lake George (New York)
Diamond Island (Montana), an island in the Yellowstone River
Diamond Island (Vermont), an island in Lake Champlain
Diamond Lake (disambiguation)
Diamond Township, Cherokee County, Iowa

Elsewhere
Diamond Hill, Kowloon, Hong Kong
Diamond Hill (Ireland)
Diamond Hill, site of the 1900 Second Boer War Battle of Diamond Hill
Diamond Island (Tasmania), Australia
Diamond Island (Myanmar)
Diamond Island (Grenadines)
Diamond Lake (Ontario), Canada, various lakes
Three lakes in New Zealand (see List of lakes of New Zealand):
Diamond Lake, New Zealand, in Tasman Region
Diamond Lake, Glenorchy, in Otago Region
Diamond Lake, Wanaka, in Otago Region
The Diamond (Enniskillen), the town square in Enniskillen, County Fermanagh, Northern Ireland

Businesses
Diamond Aircraft Industries, a manufacturer of light aircraft based in Austria
Diamond Bank, a Nigerian full-service bank
Diamond Comic Distributors, the largest comic book distributor serving North America
Diamond East Midlands, a British bus company
Diamond Foods, formerly Diamond Walnut Growers, a packaged food company based in California
Diamond Insurance, British insurance provider focused on women car drivers
Diamond Light Source, a British synchrotron research facility
Diamond Management & Technology Consultants (commonly "Diamond"), a Chicago-based consulting company
Diamond Multimedia, a computer hardware and electronics company
Diamond North West, a British bus company in the north-west
Diamond Select Toys, an American toy company founded by Diamond Comic Distributors
Diamond West Midlands, a British bus company in the West Midlands
Diamond's, a former department store chain based in Phoenix, Arizona, USA
The Diamond (department store), Charleston, West Virginia, USA

Music
Diamond Records, a label based in New York City
The Diamonds, a Canadian singing quartet of the 1950s and 1960s
The Diamonds (Jamaican band), a reggae band
Diamond certification or record, a music recording sales certification
Diamond, a former alias of Cascada.

Albums
Diamond (4Minute album), (2010)
Diamond (12012 album), (2007)
Diamond (Constant Deviants album), 2012
Diamond (Spandau Ballet album), (1982)
Diamond (Stick to Your Guns album), (2012)
Diamond (Jaci Velasquez album), (2012)
Diamond - The Ultimate Collection, a Westlife album (2012)
Diamonds (Elton John album), (2017)
Diamonds (Hawk Nelson album), (2015)
Diamonds, a 2014 album by Johnnyswim
Diamonds, a 2015 box set by Boney M.
Diamonds, a 2010 album by Kraan

Songs
"Diamond" (Julian Austin song) (1997)
"Diamond" (Bump of Chicken song) (2000)
"Diamonds" (Morgan Evans song) (2019)
"Diamonds" (Herb Alpert song) (1986)
"Diamonds" (Fabolous song) (2007)
"Diamonds" (Amanda Lear song) (1980)
"Diamonds" (Megan Thee Stallion and Normani song) (2020)
"Diamonds" (Princess Princess song) (1989)
"Diamonds" (Rihanna song) (2012)
"Diamonds" (Sam Smith song) (2020)
"Diamonds" (Starboy Nathan song) (2011)
"Diamonds" (instrumental), a 1963 instrumental by Jet Harris and Tony Meehan
"Diamonds", a song by The Boxer Rebellion
"Diamonds", a song by Common from Nobody Smiling
"Diamond", a song by Duster from Contemporary Movement
"Diamond", a song by Exo from The War
"Diamonds", a song by the Hunter Brothers from Been a Minute
"Diamonds", a song by Manafest from The Moment
"Diamond", a song by Misia from Mars & Roses
"Diamonds", a 1979 song by Chris Rea from Deltics
"Diamond", a song by Via Verdi

Games
Diamond (game), a two-player abstract strategy board game invented by Larry Back
Diamonds (video game), a 1992 video game for the Macintosh
Diamond (Shugo Chara!) or Dia, a character from Shugo Chara!
Pokémon Diamond and Pearl, a pair of 2006 video games for the Nintendo DS
Pokémon Brilliant Diamond and Shining Pearl, a pair of 2021 video games for the Nintendo Switch, remakes of Diamond and Pearl

Film and television
Diamonds (1920 film), a German silent crime film by Friedrich Feher
Diamonds (1937 film), a German crime film directed by Eduard von Borsody 
Diamonds (1939 film)
The Diamond (film), a 1954 British 3-D movie
Diamonds (1947 film)
Diamonds (1975 film), an Israeli-American heist film starring Robert Shaw and Shelley Winters
Diamonds (1999 film), an American comedy starring Kirk Douglas and Dan Aykroyd
Diamonds (Canadian TV series), a Canadian television series that aired on Global from 1987 to 1989
Diamonds (UK TV series), a British television series that aired on ITV in 1981
"Diamonds" (Charlie Jade), an episode of Charlie Jade
Diamond Destiny, a baby character in the film Storks

Sports
Baseball diamond or baseball field
The Diamond (Richmond, Virginia), a baseball stadium
Airdrieonians F.C. or Diamonds, a Scottish football club 
Australia national netball team or Diamonds
Auckland Diamonds, a New Zealand former netball team
Denver Diamonds, an American women's soccer team
Diamonds (Super Fours), a women's cricket team that competed in the Super Fours
Diamond X, a disc golf course in Montana
Nashville Diamonds, an American soccer team
Northern Diamonds, a women's cricket team based in Yorkshire and North East England
Texas Revolution (indoor football) or Arkansas Diamonds, an American indoor football team
Waterloo Diamonds (1989–1993), a former baseball team based in Waterloo, Iowa
Yorkshire Diamonds, a women's cricket team that competed in the Women's Cricket Super League

Ships and boats
, various Royal Navy ships
Diamond (1798 ship), a full-rigged merchant ship
Diamond (1823 ship), a three-masted square rigger
Diamond (1835 ship), an Isle of Man-built merchant ship
Diamond (narrowboat), a canal boat of the United Kingdom
 Diamond, a ship of the Third Supply fleet to Virginia colony in 1609
, a ferry in service 2007–09, renamed  in 2010 beofe being scrapped
 Diamond (HBC vessel), see Hudson's Bay Company vessels

Other uses
Rhombus (◊), a shape
Lozenge (shape) (◊), a type of rhombus
Diamonds (ballet), third movement of George Balanchine's Jewels
Diamond (comics), a fictional character in the NEW-GEN comic books published by Marvel Comics
Diamond (dog), a dog supposedly owned by Sir Isaac Newton
Diamond (grape), a wine grape varietal grown in the Finger Lakes AVA
DIAMOND (project), a project for optimizing the operation of wastewater treatment plants
Diamond (typography), the typographic size between pearl and brilliant
Diamond principle (◊), in mathematical set theory
Diamond Tower, a skyscraper in Ramat Gan, Israel
The Diamond (skyscraper), a skyscraper in Taipei, Taiwan
The Diamond, a 1998 fantasy novel by J. Robert King and Ed Greenwood
Diamond White (cider), a brand of white cider

See also
Diamond crossing, a level crossing of two rail tracks
Diamond interchange, type of highway interchange
Diamond knot, a knot for forming a decorative loop on the end of a cord such as on a lanyard
Diamond plate, a type of sheet metal with raised lozenges
Diamond Tree, a giant Karri tree in Western Australia
Diamant (disambiguation)
Diamante poem, a form of poetry
Diament (disambiguation)
Max Dimont (1912–1992), Finnish American historian and author
Dymond (disambiguation)